Silene takeshimensis (Japanese:), also known as the Ulleung catchfly, is a flower that is native to Ulleungdo and is found between rocks.

Description
Flowers bloom from June to August and it grows up from 20 cms to 50 cms. It has lanceolate leaves and the leaves in the middle are usually the length of around 6 to 9 cms and width is around 7 to 10 mms.

References

takeshimensis
Flora of South Korea